Sheru may refer to 

Vithika Sheru (born 1994), Indian actress
Junglezen Sheru, a book by Swami Samarpanananda